Frédéric Van Roekeghem (born 1961) is a senior French health official.

On 22 September 2004 he was appointed General Director of the National Workers Health Insurance Fund :fr:la Caisse nationale d'assurance-maladie des travailleurs salariés (CNAMTS), replacement Daniel Lenoir, then appointed in November 2004 to be director of the overall supervising body of the three National health insurance funds. :fr:Union nationale des caisses d'assurance maladie which had been created in August 2004. He served in this position until 2014, when he was succeeded by Nicolas Revel.

References

Videos in French 

http://www.france5.fr/c-dans-l-air/invites/frederic-van-roekeghem-34551

External links (French) 

 L'expansion.fr, 1/3/2005, Nommé en novembre 2004 à la tête de la Caisse nationale d'assurance-maladie des travailleurs salariés (CNAMTS), Frédéric Van Roekeghem, 43 ans, est un directeur général doté de pouvoirs sans précédent
 Lemonde.fr, 8/10/2012, "Rocky", le "ministre bis" de la santé, Jusqu'ici, l'homme qui règne sur l'assurance-maladie depuis huit ans a résisté à tous les changements de ministres. Au point de devenir le directeur d'organisme de sécurité sociale le plus influent de France
 L'argus de l'assurance.com, Biographie de Frédéric van Roekeghem

1961 births
Living people
People from Saint-Quentin, Aisne
French people of Belgian descent
French health officials
École Polytechnique alumni
ENSTA Paris alumni
Corps de l'armement